The City of Sale was a local government area located about  east of Melbourne, the state capital of Victoria, Australia.

History

Sale was first incorporated as a borough on 10 August 1863, and was extended on 24 December 1873. It became a town on 17 September 1924, and was proclaimed a city on 31 May 1950. In 1966-1967, it annexed a small area to its east and north-east from the Shire of Avon.

On 2 December 1994, the City of Sale was abolished, and along with the Shires of Alberton, Avon and Maffra, and parts of the Shire of Rosedale, was merged into the newly created Shire of Wellington.

Wards

The City of Sale was divided into three wards, each of which elected three councillors:
 South Ward
 North Ward
 East Ward

Towns and localities
 Pearsondale
 Sale*
 Wurruk

* Council seat.

Population

* Estimate in the 1958 Victorian Year Book.

References

External links
 Victorian Places - Sale

Sale